Take Me Out to the Ball Game is a 1949 Technicolor musical film produced in the Arthur Freed unit of MGM. It stars Frank Sinatra, Esther Williams, Gene Kelly, Betty Garrett, Edward Arnold and Jules Munshin, and was directed by Busby Berkeley. The title and nominal theme is taken from the unofficial anthem of American baseball, "Take Me Out to the Ball Game." The film was released in the United Kingdom as Everybody's Cheering.

Plot 
The fictional vaudeville-era baseball Wolves are newly owned by a woman named K.C. Higgins. Two of the Wolves' players, Eddie O'Brien and Dennis Ryan, are also part-time vaudevillians. Dennis falls for her, and then Eddie as well, while Dennis is the object of the affections of ardent fan Shirley Delwyn. All of them must contend with a number of gangsters led by Joe Lorgan looking to win a big bet by impairing Eddie's play and causing him to be kicked off the team.

The story may have been influenced by the real life story of actor/ballplayer Mike Donlin who was a baseball player while also being a Vaudevillian performer and later a film actor in early Hollywood.

Cast
Frank Sinatra as Dennis Ryan
Esther Williams as K.C. Higgins
Gene Kelly as Eddie O'Brien
Betty Garrett as Shirley Delwyn
Jules Munshin as Nat Goldberg
Edward Arnold as Joe Lorgan
Richard Lane as Michael Gilhuly
Tom Dugan as Slappy Burke
Ed Cassidy as Teddy Roosevelt (uncredited)
Mitchell Lewis as Fisherman (uncredited)

Production
The film was announced in May 1948. It was based on a story by Gene Kelly and Stanley Donen, with a script by Harry Tugend. The female lead of club owner K.C. Higgins was originally to be played by Ginger Rogers, but she withdrew a month before filming and Esther Williams replaced her. Williams claimed that Judy Garland was originally slated to star but was replaced because of substance-abuse problems. Sinatra's role of Dennis Ryan was originally intended for professional baseball manager (and former player) Leo Durocher.

According to TCM's Alicia Malone, Williams maintained a positive relationship with Sinatra but did not enjoy making the film because of the exhausting directorial demands set by Kelly. Although Busby Berkeley was hired as director by producer Arthur Freed, Berkeley withdrew and much of the film was directed by Kelly and Stanley Donen. Though the reason provided for Berkeley's departure was exhaustion, his exit may have been necessitated by his chronic alcoholism and depression. However, his touch can be seen in Williams's pool sequence.

Songs
"Take Me Out to the Ball Game" (music and lyrics by Jack Norworth and Albert Von Tilzer) – Gene Kelly and Frank Sinatra, reprise by Esther Williams
"Yes, Indeedy" (music by Roger Edens, lyrics by Betty Comden and Adolph Green) – Gene Kelly and Frank Sinatra
"O'Brien to Ryan to Goldberg" (music by Roger Edens, lyrics by Betty Comden and Adolph Green) – Gene Kelly, Frank Sinatra and Jules Munshin
"The Right Girl for Me" (music by Roger Edens, lyrics by Betty Comden and Adolph Green) – Frank Sinatra
"It's Fate Baby, It's Fate" (music by Roger Edens, lyrics by Betty Comden and Adolph Green) – Frank Sinatra and Betty Garrett
"Strictly U.S.A." (music and lyrics by Roger Edens) – Betty Garrett, Frank Sinatra, Esther Williams and Gene Kelly
"The Hat My Dear Old Father Wore upon St. Patrick's Day" (music and lyrics by Jean Schwartz and William Jerome) – Gene Kelly

Deleted songs
The song "Boys and Girls Like You and Me," originally written by Rodgers and Hammerstein for Oklahoma! (1943), was filmed with Sinatra singing to Garrett but was cut from the released film; the outtake survives today and is included as an extra feature on the DVD.
"Baby Doll," sung by Kelly to Williams and including a dance, was deleted from the released film. This footage also survives and is included on the DVD.

Reception
Take Me Out to the Ball Game was a box-office success, earning $2,987,000 in the U.S. and Canada and $978,000 overseas, resulting in a profit of $675,000.

The film received modestly positive reviews, although some reviewers felt that the cast was better than the material and that the film lacked a "consistent style and pace."

Awards and honors
Harry Tugend and George Wells were nominated for the 1950 Writers Guild of America Award in the category of Best Written American Musical. They lost to Betty Comden and Adolph Green for On the Town, another MGM musical comedy also produced by Arthur Freed and also starring Gene Kelly, Frank Sinatra, Betty Garrett and Jules Munshin, which was released four months after the premiere of Take Me Out to the Ball Game.

The film is recognized by American Film Institute in these lists:
 2006: AFI's Greatest Movie Musicals – Nominated

References

External links
 
 
 
 
 

1949 films
1949 musical comedy films
1949 romantic comedy films
1940s sports comedy films
American baseball films
American musical comedy films
American romantic comedy films
American romantic musical films
Films directed by Busby Berkeley
Films produced by Arthur Freed
Films set in 1908
Metro-Goldwyn-Mayer films
Films with screenplays by George Wells
1940s English-language films
1940s American films

ja:私を野球につれてって